Ocolina is a commune in Soroca District, Moldova. It is composed of two villages, Ocolina and Țepilova.

References

Communes of Soroca District